The Jerauld County Courthouse, at the intersection of South Dakota Ave. and Burrett St. in Wessington Springs, South Dakota, is an Art Deco-style building built in 1930.  It was listed on the National Register of Historic Places in 1993.

It is a three-story concrete building clad with brick, on a raised basement.

References

External links

Courthouses in South Dakota
Courthouses on the National Register of Historic Places in South Dakota
Art Deco architecture in South Dakota
Government buildings completed in 1930
Jerauld County, South Dakota